Duyun railway station is a railway station in Duyun, Qiannan Buyei and Miao Autonomous Prefecture, Guizhou, China. It is an intermediate stop on the Guizhou–Guangxi railway. The station is operated by China Railway Chengdu Group.

The station was built in the 1940s. Work on rebuilding the station as part of an upgrade project to the line began in October 2005. The relocated station was opened on 1 January 2009. The former station buildings were demolished in 2013.

See also
Duyun East railway station

References 

Railway stations in Guizhou